A "-wich town" is a settlement in Anglo-Saxon England characterised by extensive artisanal activity and tradean "emporium". The name is derived from the Anglo-Saxon suffix , signifying "a dwelling or fortified place".

Such settlements were usually coastal  and many have left material traces found during excavation.

Eilert Ekwall wrote:

Four former "-wīc towns" are known in England as the consequence of excavation. Two of theseJorvik (Jorwic) in present-day York and Lundenwic near Londonare waterfront sites, while the other two, Hamwic in Southampton and Gipeswic (Gippeswic) in Ipswich are further inland. 

By the eleventh century, the use of -wich in placenames had been extended to include areas associated with salt production. At least nine English towns and cities carry the suffix although only five of them tend to be associated with salt: Droitwich in Worcestershire and the four -wich towns of Middlewich, Nantwich, Northwich and Leftwich in Cheshire.

See also 
 English "-wich towns" and the history of salt
 Emporium
 Wick, Caithness

References 

English toponyms
Place name element etymologies
English suffixes